The Texas Longhorns women's soccer program was established in 1993 as part of that year's Title IX settlement. Since then they have won three conference championships – one regular season and two tournaments — and been to 14 NCAA tournaments, making it as far as the Sweet Sixteen in 2004, 2006, 2007 and 2017. 

In 2006 the Longhorns finished ranked #8 in the nation, their highest end-of-season ranking ever.

All-time season results

All-time series records

Big 12 Members

Former Big 12 and SWC members

Home Field

Attendance Records

References

 
NCAA Division I women's soccer teams
Soccer clubs in Texas
Association football clubs established in 1994
1994 establishments in Texas
Big 12 Conference women's soccer